Beech Creek is an unincorporated community and stream located in Wayne County, Tennessee.  The community has one store called Beech Creek Grocery.

References 

Unincorporated communities in Wayne County, Tennessee
Unincorporated communities in Tennessee